East Monticello is an unincorporated community in Union Township, White County, in the U.S. state of Indiana.

History
East Monticello is named for a subdivision that lays east of Monticello's Washington Street Bridge and outside the incorporated city limit defined by the Tippecanoe River.  Over the years, all of the developed area in and around that subdivision has inherited the title of East Monticello, probably because of the geographical relationship to Monticello. The area is mostly residential and bounded by the Tippecanoe River to the south and west, a railroad to the north, and a cemetery to the east.

Geography

References

Unincorporated communities in White County, Indiana
Unincorporated communities in Indiana